Adam Rittenberg (born August 15, 1981) is a blogger and sports journalist for ESPN's college football section dedicated to the Big Ten Conference in college football.  Before 2008 when he joined ESPN, he was a sports writer at Daily Herald (Arlington Heights) in Illinois. Rittenberg is a graduate of Northwestern University and resides near Chicago, Illinois. He is Jewish.

See also
ESPN
Big Ten Conference

References

External links
ESPN BigTen Blog

American sports journalists
American male journalists
1981 births
Living people
Northwestern University alumni
ESPN people
American sportswriters